MuchMusic may refer to:

MuchMusic, specialty Canadian music and entertainment channel
Countdown (MuchMusic), Top 30 countdown program on the station
Dedications (MuchMusic)
Exposed (MuchMusic series)
MuchMusic Video Awards
Muchmusic VJ Search
List of programs broadcast by MuchMusic
MuchMusic Brasil, specialty Brazilian music and entertainment channel
Fuse TV, which was originally the U.S. simulcast of the Canadian MuchMusic